Phuket (or Tongkah) is one of the southern provinces (changwat) of Thailand. It consists of the island of Phuket, the country's largest island, and another 32 smaller islands off its coast. It lies off the west coast of mainland Thailand in the Andaman Sea. Phuket Island is connected by the Sarasin Bridge to Phang Nga province to the north. The next nearest province is Krabi, to the east across Phang Nga Bay.

The island was on one of the major trading routes between India and China, and was frequently mentioned in foreign ships' logs of Portuguese, French, Dutch, and English traders, but was never colonised by a European power. It formerly derived its wealth from tin and rubber and now from tourism.

Toponymy
There are several possible derivations of the relatively recent name "Phuket" (of which the digraph ph represents an aspirated ). One theory is it is derived from the word Bukit in Malay which means "hill", as this is what the island appears like from a distance.

Phuket was formerly known as Thalang ( Tha-Laang), derived from the old Malay Telong which means "cape". The northern district of the province, which was the location of the old capital, still uses this name. In Western sources and navigation charts, it was known as Junk Ceylon or Junkceylon (a corruption of the Malay Tanjung Salang;; i.e., "Cape Salang").

History

16th–18th century: European contact
The Portuguese explorer Fernão Mendes Pinto arrived in Siam in 1545. His accounts of the country go beyond Ayutthaya and include a reasonably detailed account of ports in the south of the Kingdom as well. Pinto was one of the first European explorers to detail Phuket in his travel accounts. He referred to the island as "Junk Ceylon", a name the Portuguese used for Phuket Island in their maps, mentioning the name seven times in his accounts. Pinto said that Junk Ceylon was a destination port where trading vessels made regular stops for supplies and provisions. However, during the mid-16th century, the island was in decline due to pirates and often rough and unpredictable seas, which deterred merchant vessels from visiting the island. Pinto mentioned several other notable port cities in his accounts, including Patani and Ligor, which is modern-day Nakhon Si Thammarat.

In the 17th century, the Dutch, English and, after the 1680s, the French, competed for the opportunity to trade with Junk Ceylon, which was a rich source of tin. In September 1680, a ship of the French East India Company visited the island and left with a full cargo of tin.

A year or two later, the Siamese King Narai, seeking to reduce Dutch and English influence, named as governor a French medical missionary, Brother René Charbonneau, a member of the Siam mission of the Société des Missions Étrangères. Charbonneau remained as governor until 1685.

In 1685, King Narai confirmed the French tin monopoly in Phuket to their ambassador, the Chevalier de Chaumont. Chaumont's former maître d'hôtel, Sieur de Billy, was named governor of the island. However, the French were expelled from Siam after the 1688 Siamese revolution. On 10 April 1689, Desfarges led an expedition to re-capture Thalang to restore French control in Siam. His occupation of the island led to nothing, and Desfarges returned to Puducherry in January 1690.

1785: Burmese invasion
Before the Burmese attacked Thalang in 1785 during the "Nine Armies' Wars", Francis Light, a British East India Company captain (and later founder of Penang), who had been based on the island for some years, notified the local administration that he had observed Burmese forces preparing to attack. The island's military governor had just died, so the Burmese thought that it could be easily seized. Than Phu Ying Chan, the widow of the recently deceased governor, and her sister Mook (คุณมุก)  ordered the women of the island to dress as soldiers and take positions on the Thalang city walls. The Burmese called off their attack due to the perceived strength of the defences. Short of supplies, they retreated. After a month-long siege of the capital city, the Burmese were forced to retreat on 13 March 1785. The two women became local heroines, receiving the royal titles Thao Thep Kasattri and Thao Si Sunthon from a grateful King Rama I.

The seal of Phuket is a depiction of the Two Heroines Monument along Highway 402 in Phuket. This commemorates the sisters The seal is a circle surrounded by a kranok pattern and has been used since 1985.

19th–20th centuries
During the reign of King Chulalongkorn (Rama V) from 1 October 1868 to 23 October 1910, Phuket became the administrative centre of the tin-producing southern provinces. His reign was characterized by the modernization of Siam, governmental and social reforms, and territorial concessions to the British and French. As Siam was threatened by Western expansionism, Chulalongkorn managed to save Siam from colonization.

In 1876, mining laborers in Phuket and nearby provinces formed a rebellion. This was due to the low tin price, the government's tight fiscal policy, and Chinese laborers are not treated fairly.

In 1933 Monthon Phuket (มณฑลภูเก็ต) was dissolved and Phuket became a province.

21st century (2001-present)
On 26 December 2004 during Boxing Day, Phuket and other nearby areas on Thailand's west coast suffered damage when they were struck by a tsunami caused by the earthquake off Sumatra in Indonesia. The waves destroyed several highly populated areas in the region, killing up to 5,300 people in Thailand, and two hundred thousand more throughout the South and Southeast Asian regions. Some 250 were reported dead in Phuket, including foreign tourists. Almost all of the major beaches on the west coast of Phuket, especially Kamala, Patong, Karon, and Kata sustained major damage, with some damage caused to resorts and villages on the island's southern beaches. Thailand's hardest-hit area was the Takua Pa District of Phang Nga province north of Phuket, where a thousand or more Burmese workers building new beach resorts died.
In December 2006, Thailand launched the first of 22 tsunami-detection buoys to be positioned around the Indian Ocean as part of a regional warning system.

In early 2020, COVID-19 pandemic had reached Phuket. However, in March, Phuket and the rest of Southern Thailand went to the lockdown, citing the beginning of stay-at-home orders, mask mandate, and with social distancing, while it was relatively successful in containing the virus, its tourism-dependent economy was badly affected. Two years later, COVID-19 response in the country was ended by 2022 as ahead of the post-pandemic phase.

Geography

Phuket is the largest island in Thailand. It is located in the Andaman Sea in southern Thailand. The island is mostly mountainous with a mountain range in the west of the island from the north to the south.

Although some recent geographical works refer to the sections of the Tenasserim Hills in the isthmus as the "Phuket Range", these names are not found in classical geographic sources. Besides, the name Phuket is relatively recent having previously been named Jung Ceylon and Thalang. However, it has been reported  by barometric pressure readings that there is an even higher elevation (with no apparent name), of 542 meters above sea level, in the Kamala hills behind Kathu waterfall.

The population was 249,446 in 2000, rising to 525,709 in the 2010 decennial census, the highest growth rate of all provinces nationwide at 7.4 percent annually. Some 600,000 people reside on Phuket currently, among them migrants, international ex-pats, Thais registered in other provinces, and locals. The registered population, however, includes only Thais who are registered in a thabian ban or house registration book, which most are not, and at the end of 2012 was 360,905 persons.

Other islands are:
Ko Lone , Ko Maprao , Ko Naka Yai , Ko Racha Noi , Ko Racha Yai , and the second biggest, Ko Sire .

Forest, rubber, and palm oil plantations cover 60 percent of the island. The west coast has several sandy beaches. The east coast beaches are more often muddy. Near the southernmost point is Laem Phromthep ("Brahma's Cape"), a popular viewpoint. In the mountainous north of the island is the Khao Phra Thaeo No-Hunting Area, protecting more than 20 km2 of the rainforest. The three highest peaks of this reserve are the Khao Prathiu, Khao Bang Pae , and Khao Phara .

Climate
Under the Köppen climate classification, Phuket features a tropical monsoon climate (Am). Due to its proximity to the equator, in the year, there is little variation in temperatures. Phuket has a dry season that runs from December to March and a wet season that covers the remaining eight months. However, like many cities that feature a tropical monsoon climate, Phuket sees some precipitation even during its dry season.

Demographics

As with most of Thailand, the majority of the population is Buddhist, but there is a significant number of Muslims (20 percent) in Phuket, mainly descendants of the island's original Austronesian peoples. Among the Muslims, many are of Malay descent. People of Chinese ancestry make up an even larger population, many of whom are descendants of the tin miners who migrated to Phuket during the 19th century. Peranakans, known as "Phuket Babas" in the local tongue, constitute a fair share of Chinese community members, particularly among those who have family ties with the Peranakans of Penang and Malacca.

Phuket provincial population in the preliminary count of the 2010 census was counted to be 525,018 people, including some 115,881 expatriates, or 21.1 per cent of the population. However, it is admitted this is inaccurate since the Phuket Provincial Employment Office currently records for more than 64,000 Burmese, Lao and Cambodian workers legally residing on the island. The Thai census figure for 2015 shows a population of 386,605 persons.

The number of people on Phuket island swells to over a million during the high season, as tourists, mainly from Western Europe, China, Russia, and the United States flock to Phuket around Christmas.

Religion

Administrative divisions

Provincial government
Phuket is divided into three districts (amphoe), which are further divided into 17 subdistricts (tambon), and 103 villages (muban).
Mueang Phuket
Kathu
Thalang

Local government
As of 26 November 2019 there are: one Phuket Provincial Administration Organisation and 12 municipal (thesaban) areas in the province. Phuket has city (thesaban nakhon) status. Kathu and Patong have town (thesaban mueang) status.  Further 9 subdistrict municipalities (thesaban tambon). The non-municipal areas are administered by 6 Subdistrict Administrative Organisations - SAO (ongkan borihan suan tambon).

Economy

Tin mining was a major source of income for the island from the 16th century until petering out in the 20th century. In modern times, Phuket's economy has rested on two pillars: rubber tree plantations (making Thailand the biggest producer of rubber in the world) and tourism.

Since the 1980s, the sandy beaches on the west coast of the island have been developed as tourist destinations, with Patong, Karon, and Kata being the most popular. Since the 2004 tsunami, all damaged buildings and attractions have been restored. Phuket is being intensely developed, with many new hotels, apartments, and houses under construction.

In July 2005, Phuket was voted one of the world's top five retirement destinations by Fortune Magazine.

In 2017, Phuket received about 10 million visitors, most of them foreign, with China the leading contributor. Tourists generated some 385 billion baht in revenues, nearly 14 percent of the 2.77 trillion baht earned by the nation as a whole.

The first half of 2019 saw a dip in the number of tourists visiting Phuket, driving lower hotel occupancy rates and leading to increased price competition. RevPAR (revenue per available room) is down. A decline in the number of tourists, combined with an oversupply of hotel rooms, is the root of the problem.  Despite falling numbers, the Tourism Authority of Thailand (TAT) claims that tourism revenues have risen by 3.1% in the first half of 2019.

It is unclear how many hotel rooms Phuket has available. Oxfam says it has 60,000 hotel rooms for its 9.1 million annual visitors. The Bangkok Post in September 2019 reported that Phuket has 600 hotels with 40,000 rooms. Three weeks earlier it said that Phuket had 93,941 hotel rooms available, excluding villas and hostels, with an additional 15,000 projected to become available by 2024.

Transportation
Air

Phuket International Airport (HKT) commenced a 5.7 billion baht (US$185.7 million) expansion in September 2012, scheduled for completion on 14 February 2016. The airport will increase its annual handling capacity from 6.5 million to 12.5 million passengers, and add a new international terminal.

Rail
There is currently no rail line to Phuket. Trains run to Surat Thani and Khiri Rat Nikhom 230 km away.

City transit
Songthaews are a common mode of transport in Phuket. Phuket's songthaews are larger than those found in other areas of Thailand. Songthaews are the cheapest mode of transportation from town to town. They travel between the town and the beaches. There are also conventional bus services and motorbike taxis. The latter are found in large numbers in the main town and at Patong Beach. Traditional tuk-tuks have been replaced by small vans, mostly red, with some being yellow or green. Car taxis in Phuket are quite expensive and charge flat rates between towns. Privately run buses are available from the airport to Phuket Town and major beaches. It is often recommended by locals to take the ride-share company, Grab.

Bus

Phuket's Bus Station 2 BKS Terminal is the long-distance arrivals hub for buses to and from Bangkok and other major Thai cities and provinces. Located four kilometres to the north of Phuket's town centre and port, the complex is large and modern, linking with transportation by tuk-tuk, metered taxi, motorcycle taxi, songthaew, or local bus to the island's beaches and resorts. There are daily scheduled buses from private and government-run companies going to Phuket from Bangkok's Mo Chit and Southern terminal stations.

Tram
The Mass Rapid Transit Authority of Thailand (MRTA) announced in 2018 that bidding to construct a 60-kilometer-long, 23-station tram network in Phuket will commence in 2020. The 39 billion baht tram is part of the government's Private-Public-Partnership (PPP) plan which ensures it will be fast-tracked. The planned route stretches from Takua Thung District in Phang Nga province to Chalong in Phuket. Phase one will connect Phuket International Airport with Chalong, about 40 kilometres. It will take three years to complete.

Ferry
There are daily ferry boats that connect Phuket to neighboring islands Phi Phi and Koh Lanta. Ferries depart daily from Rassada Pier and Tonsai Pier, with service expanding each year. The average price for a one-way ticket ranges from 300 THB to 1500 THB.

Health 
6 hospitals exist in Phuket. The main hospital in Phuket operated by the Ministry of Public Health is Vachira Phuket Hospital, with smaller hospitals at Thalang and Patong. 3 Private hospitals exist which are Phuket International Hospital, Bangkok Hospital Phuket, and Mission Hospital Phuket.

Human achievement index 2017

Since 2003, United Nations Development Programme (UNDP) in Thailand has tracked progress on human development at the sub-national level using the Human achievement index (HAI), a composite index covering all the eight key areas of human development. The National Economic and Social Development Board (NESDB) has taken over this task since 2017.

Sport 
In 2009, the club is formed as Phuket F.C., nicknamed The Southern Sea Kirins, and admitted to the Regional League South Division. Club home games are to be played at Surakul Stadium. Sirirak Konthong was named as the first-ever coach of Phuket. In 2010 Phuket won the Southern Regional Division 2 and finished 2nd in the Division 2 Champions League after losing to Buriram FC in the final anyway the club was promoted to 2011 Thai Division 1 League.
In 2009, the club is formed as Phuket F.C., sports_nicknamed The Southern Sea Kirins, and admitted to the Regional League South Division. Club home games are to be played at Surakul Stadium. Sirirak Konthong was named as the first-ever coach of Phuket. In 2010 Phuket won the Southern Regional Division 2 and finished second in the Division 2 Champions League after losing to Buriram FC in the final anyway the club was promoted to 2011 Thai Division 1 League.
In 2015, the club is relegated to 2016 Regional League Division 2 Southern Region.

In 2017, Phuket F.C. decided to dissolve the club due to financial problems about unfair contract cancellation.

In 2018, Phuket F.C. collapsed and combined with Banbueng F.C.  In 2019 the club was renamed to Phuket City. However, the club was renamed back to Banbueng F.C. due to the take over of Banbueng's boards again. They have moved their ground back to IPE Chonburi Stadium in Chonburi too.

In 2020, Patong City participated 2020–21 Thai League 3 Southern Region for, the first time in the professional league of club history.

Attractions 

Phuket Big Buddha is statue of Gautama Buddha in a sitting position (Maravichai: มารวิชัย) and is 45 metres (148 feet) tall and 25.45 metres (83.5 feet) wide. It is made of concrete and covered with Burmese white marble. Facing towards Ao Chalong Bay the statue is the main Buddha of the Wat Kitthi Sankaram temple (Wat Kata). The statue was declared the "Buddhist Treasure of Phuket" by Somdet Phra Yanasangwon, the Supreme Patriarch of Thailand, in 2008.  
Two Heroines Monument (อนุสาวรีย์วีรสตรี), is the monument in Thalang District, a memorial statue of Thao Thep Kasattri (Kunying Jan) and Thao Sri Sunthon (Mook), who rallied islanders in 1785 to repel Burmese invaders.
Thalang National Museum (พิพิธภัณฑสถานแห่งชาติ ถลาง), established in 1985, on the 200th anniversary of the Thalang War.

Wat Chalong (วัดฉลองหรือวัดไชยธาราราม) has a statue of Luang Pho Cham, who helped the people of Phuket put down the Angyee in 1876 during the reign of Rama V.

Old Phuket Town  in Phuket town, around Thalang, Dibuk, Yaowarat, Phang Nga, and Krabi Roads. The architecture is Sino-Portuguese-style.
On On Hotel  in downtown Phuket Town which was shown in the movie ‘The Beach’ with Leonardo DiCaprio in 2000.
Aquaria Phuket opened on August 24, 2019.
Freedom Beach, one of the prettiest beaches on the island, with incredibly soft white sand and clear blue waters. It is just a few minutes away from Patong Beach, accessible by boat or hiking. 
A day trip to the Phi Phi Islands takes about 50 minutes when departing from Phuket by speedboat and these islands are a beautiful sight worth taking in.

Local culture 
Thao Thep Krasattri and Thao Si Sunthon Fair (งานท้าวเทพกระษัตรี - ท้าวศรีสุนทร) is held on March 13 every year to commemorate the two heroines who rallied the Thalang people to repel Burmese invaders.
Nine Emperor Gods Festival (Hokkien: 九皇勝會; Kiú-Hông Sēng-Huē or 九皇爺, Kiú-Hông Iâ) also known among local Phuket Chinese as the Vegetarian Festival (Hokkien: 食菜節; Tsia̍h-tshài-tseh;  Thai: เทศกาลกินเจ (กินผัก-เจี๊ยะฉ่าย)), is held on the first day of the ninth Chinese lunar month (usually falling between the end of September to early October). Phuket islanders of Chinese ancestry commit themselves to a nine-day vegetarian diet, a form of purification believed to help make the forthcoming year trouble-free. The festival is marked by several ascetic displays, including fire-walking and ascending sharp-bladed ladders.
Ghost Festival (Hokkien: 普渡節; Phóo-tōo-tseh, Full name: 盂蘭盆勝會; Û-lân-phûn Sēng-Huē), is held on the middle day of the seventh Chinese lunar month. Intrinsic to the Ghost Festival is ancestor worship. Activities include preparing food offerings, burning incense, and burning joss paper, a papier-mâché form of material items such as clothes, gold, and other goods for the visiting spirits. Elaborate meals (often vegetarian) are served with empty seats for each of the deceased in the family. Other festivities may include, buying and releasing miniature paper boats and lanterns on water, which signifies giving direction to lost souls.
Phuket King's Cup Regatta (งานแข่งเรือใบชิงถ้วยพระราชทาน) is held every December. The Kata Beach Resort hosts yachtsmen, largely from neighbouring countries who compete for trophies.
Laguna Phuket Triathlon (ลากูน่าภูเก็ตไตรกีฬา) is held each December. The triathlon (a  swim, a  bike race and a  run and a  fun run) attracts athletes from all over the world.
Phuket Travel Fair (เทศกาลเปิดฤดูการท่องเที่ยวจังหวัดภูเก็ต), starting 1 November, is usually called the Patong Carnival, from the place where celebrations happen. Colourful parades, sports events, and beauty competitions for foreign tourists are major activities. A popular festival, the Patong Carnival opening drew over 30,000 foreign and Thai tourists.
Chao Le (Sea Gypsy) Boat Floating Festival (งานประเพณีลอยเรือชาวเล) falls during the middle of the sixth and eleventh lunar months yearly. The sea gypsy villages at Rawai and Sapam hold their ceremonies on the 13th; Ko Si-re celebrates on the 14th; and Laem La (east of the bridge on Phuket's northern tip) on the 15th. Ceremonies, which centre on the setting of small boats adrift similar to the Thai festival of Loi Krathong, are held at night and their purpose is to drive away evil and bring good luck.
Phuket Bike Week is the biggest motorbike event in Asia. Motorcyclists with their motorcycles and spectators from many countries like France join this event in every year. The event highlights include a motorcycle exhibition, bike parades "Ride for Peace", custom bike contests, live entertainment, Mr. Phuket Bike Week competition, bike accessories and apparel from local and international venders.

Twin towns and sister cities
Phuket province has a number of sister cities. They are:

 Nice, France (1989)
 Las Vegas, United States (1997)
 Yantai, China (1997)

 Port Blair, India (2005)
 Hainan, China (2005)
 Nakhodka, Russia (2006)

 Suining, China (2016)
 Macau, SAR China (2018)

Gallery

References

External links

 Forbes, Andrew, and Henley, David: Phuket’s Historic Peranakan Community

 
Islands of Thailand
Provinces of Thailand
Southern Thailand
Andaman Sea
Strait of Malacca